Sauvage, French for "savage" may refer to:

 as a surname 
 Catherine Sauvage (1929–1998), a French singer and actress
 Cyrille Sauvage (born 1973), a French racing driver
 Frédéric Sauvage (1786–1857), a French boat builder who carried out early tests of screw-type marine propellers
 George M. Sauvage, an author of the Catholic Encyclopedia
 Henri Sauvage (1873–1932), a French architectural designer
 Henri Émile Sauvage (1842–1917), a French paleontologist and ichthyologist
 James Sauvage (born James Savage, 1849–1922), a Welsh baritone singer
 Jean-Pierre Sauvage (born 1944), a French coordination chemist
 Louise Sauvage (born 1973), an Australian paralympic wheelchair racer
 Paul Sauvage (footballer) (born 1939), a retired French footballer
 Paul Sauvage (aviator) (1897–1917), a French World War I flying ace
 Piat Sauvage (1744–1818), a Belgian painter

 Other
 Le Sauvage (English title (UK): Call Me Savage), a 1975 French film starring Yves Montand and Catherine Deneuve.
 Sauvage, a 2018 French film written and directed by Camille Vidal-Naquet and starring Félix Maritaud.
 Les Sauvages, a commune in the Rhône department in eastern France.
 A wine that has been fermented with wild or indigenous yeasts.

References